Andrés Felipe Roa Estrada (born May 25, 1993) is a Colombian professional footballer who plays as an attacking midfielder or a left winger for Al-Batin in the Saudi Professional League.

Career
He was crowned champion of Colombia with Deportivo Cali in 2015. He is known for his flair and pace as a creative midfielder. He impressed in his first Copa Libertadores campaign despite his side's poor showing and managed to score against Racing Club.

In July 2019, Roa joined Argentine Primera División club Independiente on a one-year loan deal with a purchase option on 1,3 million dollars until 31 January 2020. In December 2019 it was reported, that Independiente was ready to trigger the option. However, the clubs never reached a final agreement, but instead extended the duration of the loan in June 2020 until the end of the year, once again with a purchase option. On 30 December 2020, Independiente finally paid the purchase option and signed Roa on a permanent deal. In July 2022, Roa moved to fellow league club Argentinos Juniors.

On 7 January 2023, Roa joined Saudi Arabian club Al-Batin.

Honours
Deportivo Cali
 Categoría Primera A: 2015-I

Colombia
 Copa América: Third place 2016

References

External links 
 
 

1993 births
Living people
Colombian footballers
Colombian expatriate footballers
Colombia international footballers
Association football midfielders
Copa América Centenario players
Footballers at the 2016 Summer Olympics
Olympic footballers of Colombia
People from Atlántico Department
Deportivo Cali footballers
Unión Magdalena footballers
Club Atlético Huracán footballers
Club Atlético Independiente footballers
Argentinos Juniors footballers
Al Batin FC players
Categoría Primera A players
Categoría Primera B players
Argentine Primera División players
Saudi Professional League players
Colombian expatriate sportspeople in Argentina
Expatriate footballers in Argentina
Colombian expatriate sportspeople in Saudi Arabia
Expatriate footballers in Saudi Arabia